Pardhan (or Pradhan) is a dialect of Gondi spoken by the Pardhan people, a community who are the traditional bards of the Gonds. Its speakers are found in areas where the Gonds live: southeastern Madhya Pradesh, far-eastern Maharashtra and northern Telangana. Approximately 140,000 people speak this dialect.

References

Agglutinative languages
Dravidian languages
Endangered languages of India